Atkhatay (Adkhaatai) is a rural locality (a settlement) in Zaigrayevsky District, Republic of Buryatia, Russia. The population was 224 as of 2010. There are 5 streets.

Geography 
Atkhatay is located 44 km south of Zaigrayevo (the district's administrative centre) by road. Staraya Bryan is the nearest rural locality.

References 

Rural localities in Zaigrayevsky District